SME One Asia Awards is an event that is organised by The APF Group in Singapore. Currently in its fourth year, it has a total of 350 nominations and 191 winners, and has at least 1000 attendees for the awards dinner which is held at Marina Bay Sands every year.

History
The SME One Asia Awards was established in 2011 by the APF Group Pte Ltd to recognise the businesses and their leaders’ achievements of the Small and Medium Enterprises in Singapore, particularly the companies that have implemented the business practices that contribute to the development of people, society and the environment. Through these developments, the awards promote sustainable growth in Singapore as well as overseas.

Background
The SME One Asia Awards targets SMEs with more than S$1 million and less than S$100 million in yearly revenue.  Currently, SMEs are an important part in Asia, as they help generate economic growth in Asia. Furthermore, the awards are built on a branding and publicity programme dedicated to raising the profiles and awareness of its winners.

The SME One Asia Awards is also a platform in which socially responsible business leaders are given the opportunity to connect with each other, share business ideas and practices as well as growing to become an active community of socially responsible leaders.
In 2012, the SME One Asia Awards ranked and judged 120 submissions, which included nominations from China, Cambodia, Philippines, Malaysia and Indonesia, of which 66 companies were selected as winners across the six award categories.

In 2013, the SME One Asia Awards spanned eleven industries with 27.3% of the companies coming from the service industry, 4.6% of the companies coming from the information technology sector, 1.5% of the companies came from the entertainment and tourism sectors, another 1.5% of the companies came from agriculture industry, 16.7% came from the construction industry, 18.2% of the companies came from distribution and wholesale sector, 4.6% came from the electronics and engineering sector, 6.1% of the companies came from the manufacturing industry, a further 6.1% of the companies were in the F&B sector, 3% of the companies came from the logistics and transport industry and last but not least, 10.6% of the companies came from the real estate sector.

Awards
This award comprises six categories, defined by the number of years the participating company has been in operation. The Distinguished Awards, for companies that have been in operation for more than 15 years. The Prominent Awards are for companies who have been in operation for more than 9 years. The Notable Awards are for companies who have been in operation for more than 5 years. The Emerging Awards are for companies who have been in operation for more than 1 year but less than 4 years. Last but not least, the Foreign Enterprise Award is given to foreign companies with a local presence and the Overseas Enterprise Award which is given to overseas businesses.

In 2012, there was the introduction of the special awards category. The awards were designed to acknowledge companies with significant contributions. The Avant -Garde award is awarded to companies with creative business innovation. There is also the Hoffen award which is awarded to companies which inspire community development.

Avant-Garde Award
The Avant-Garde Award recognises companies that display business innovation and creativity, as well as companies who have effectively introduced inspiring, new and revolutionary ideas to their business models, products and/or services. Furthermore, the implementation of the ideas has to be well defined and must contribute to the company's overall business performance. In addition to that, the idea has to be original and surprising and must be able to capture imagination of people as well as the industry. One Winner of this Award was BreadTalk Group, who won it in 2012

Hoffen Award
The Hoffen Award recognises the faith and commitment of companies that bring new life and revival to living spaces, as well as honouring the companies which contribute to the betterment of the environment and people's lives. This award is meant to inspire people and social groups to make a difference, and for businesses to go beyond profit making. One winner of this Award was The Fullerton Heritage who won it in 2012.

Judging Process
The participating companies undergo both quantitative and qualitative assessment from a panel of judges. The judging criterion comprises the Companies’ Sales Turnover, their Brand Value, their Profit Margin / Profit per Staff, Entrepreneur Spirit / Business Model, and whether there is Responsible Leadership.

Judges
The SMEs that have been nominated for this award will have to undergo a selection process with advice and assessment from a panel of Judges/Advisors. In addition to that, the appointed panel of judges will provide insights and opinions that would add a critical dimension that will help to develop SMEs across the region. Furthermore, impartiality and confidentiality of the judging and auditing processes is ensured as an independent panel of judges/advisors from various associations, institutions and industry leaders are selected.

Winners

2011

2012

2013

Awards Dinner
The inaugural event was held at Marina Bay Sands Grand Ballroom on 28 October 2011. It attracted 110 nominations, of which 60 companies were winners. There were 1100 guests who attended the gala awards ceremony presided over by the Guest of Honour, Mr Seah Kian Peng who presented the award trophies. Several ambassadors from various countries in Asia were present to witness the ceremony.

In 2012, the second Awards Dinner was held at Marina Bay Sands, with 65 winners from 9 categories with a total of 1130 guests attending the event. The guests include the winners and their guests, as well as business owners and foreign delegates. Furthermore, the guest of honour for that year was Mr Seah Kian Peng.

In 2013, the third Awards Dinner was held at Marina Bay Sands, with a total of 1180 guests attending the event, the guests include the Winners and their guests, business owners, distinguished guests, ambassadors, foreign delegates, members from trade associations, government institutions,  sponsors as well as partners, media partners and journalists from the various newspapers.

Below is the summary of the number of awards given out for each year, including significant winners

Media coverage
For the SME One Asia Awards Dinner, Channel News Asia was the official media partner for the SME One Asia Awards. Other supporting media partners include The Business Times, The Straits Times and Lianhe Zaobao. Also included are the various write ups that were featured in other publications.

Regional expansion
The SME One Asia Awards 2013 includes participants from Malaysia, Philippines, Indonesia, Cambodia, South Korea and China. Supporting regional partners and their media providers are also invited for the event.

Supporting partners
Supporting Organisation: Singapore Indian Chamber of Commerce and Industry (SICCI)

Official Knowledge Management Partner: Singapore Institute of Management

Official Design Partner: A.S. Louken Group Pte Ltd

Official Trophy Co-Sponsor: Royal Selangor International

Official Media Partner: CNBC

References

Economy of Singapore
Business and industry awards
Organizations related to small and medium-sized enterprises